Kouk Kakthen is a khum (commune) of Thma Puok District in Banteay Meanchey Province in north-western Cambodia.

Villages

 Dei(ដី)
 Sdau(ស្ដៅ)
 Treas
 Kouk Kakthen(គោកកឋិន)
 Ta Siev(តាសៀវ)
 Chonleas Dai(ជន្លាសដៃ)
 Ta Trai(តាត្រៃ)
 Preah Chhor(ព្រះឈរ)
 Kouk Khpos(គោកខ្ពស់)

References

Communes of Banteay Meanchey province
Thma Puok District